The NATO intervention in Bosnia and Herzegovina was a series of actions undertaken by NATO whose stated aim was to establish long-term peace during and after the Bosnian War. NATO's intervention began as largely political and symbolic, but gradually expanded to include large-scale air operations and the deployment of approximately 60,000 soldiers of the Implementation Force.

Early involvement and monitoring
NATO involvement in the Bosnian War and the Yugoslav Wars in general began in February 1992, when the alliance issued a statement urging all the belligerents in the conflict to allow the deployment of United Nations peacekeepers. While primarily symbolic, this statement paved the way for later NATO actions.

On July 10, 1992, at a meeting in Helsinki, NATO foreign ministers agreed to assist the United Nations in monitoring compliance with sanctions established under United Nations Security Council resolutions 713 (1991) and 757 (1992). This led to the commencement of Operation Maritime Monitor off the coast of Montenegro, which was coordinated with the Western European Union Operation Sharp Guard in the Strait of Otranto on July 16. On October 9, 1992, the Security Council passed Resolution 781, establishing a no-fly zone over Bosnia-Herzegovina. In response, on October 16, NATO expanded its mission in the area to include Operation Sky Monitor, which monitored Bosnian airspace for flights from the Federal Republic of Yugoslavia.

Enforcing compliance 1992–1993
On November 16, 1992, the Security Council issued Resolution 787, which called upon member states to "halt all inward and outbound maritime shipping in order to inspect and verify their cargos" to ensure compliance with sanctions. In response to this resolution, NATO deactivated Maritime Monitor on November 22, and replaced it with Operation Maritime Guard, under which NATO forces were authorized to stop ships and inspect their cargos. Unlike Sky Monitor and Maritime Monitor, this was a true enforcement mission, not just a monitoring one.

NATO's air mission also switched from monitoring to enforcement. The Security Council issued Resolution 816, which authorized states to use measures "to ensure compliance" with the no-fly zone over Bosnia. In response, on April 12, 1993, NATO initiated Operation Deny Flight which was tasked with enforcing the no-fly zone, using fighter aircraft based in the region.

Throughout 1993, the role of NATO forces in Bosnia gradually grew. On June 10, 1993, NATO and the UN agreed that aircraft acting under Deny Flight would provide close air support to UNPROFOR at the request of the UN. On June 15, NATO integrated Operation Maritime Guard and Western European Union naval activities in the region into Operation Sharp Guard, and expanded its role to include greater enforcement powers.

Growing role of air power 1994

On February 28, 1994, the scope of NATO involvement in Bosnia increased dramatically. In an incident near Banja Luka, NATO fighters operating under Deny Flight shot down four Serb jets. This was the first combat operation in the history of NATO and opened the door for a steadily growing NATO presence in Bosnia. In April, the presence of NATO airpower continued to grow during a Serb attack on Goražde. In response, NATO launched its first close air support mission on April 10, 1994, bombing several Serb targets at the request of UN commanders.

Operations in 1995 and Operation Deliberate Force

NATO continued its air operations over Bosnia in the first half of 1995. During this period, American pilot Scott O'Grady was shot down over Bosnia by a surface-to-air missile fired by Bosnian Serb soldiers. He was eventually rescued safely, but his downing caused concern in the United States and other NATO countries about NATO air superiority in Bosnia and prompted some calls for more aggressive NATO action to eliminate Serb anti-air capabilities.

Srebrenica and the London Conference
In July 1995, the Bosnian Serbs launched an attack on the Bosnian town of Srebrenica, ending with the deaths of approximately 8,000 civilians in the Srebrenica massacre. After the events at Srebrenica, 16 nations met at the London Conference, beginning on July 21, 1995, to consider new options for Bosnia. As a result of the conference, UN Secretary General Boutros Boutros-Ghali gave General Bernard Janvier, the UN military commander, the authority to request NATO airstrikes without consulting civilian UN officials, as a way to streamline the process. As a result of the conference, the North Atlantic Council and the UN also agreed to use NATO air strikes in response to attacks on any of the other safe areas in Bosnia. The participants at the conference also agreed in principle to the use of large-scale NATO air strikes in response to future acts of aggression by Serbs.

Operation Deliberate Force

After the London Conference, NATO planned an aggressive new air campaign against the Bosnian Serbs. On August 28, 1995, Serb forces launched a mortar shell at the Sarajevo marketplace killing 37 people. Admiral Leighton Smith, the NATO commander recommended that NATO launch retaliatory air strikes under Operation Deliberate Force. On August 30, 1995, NATO officially launched Operation Deliberate Force with large-scale bombing of Serb targets. The airstrikes lasted until September 20, 1995 and involved attacks on 338 individual targets.

Dayton Accords and IFOR
Largely as a result of the bombing under Operation Deliberate Force and changes in the battlefield situation, the belligerents in the Bosnian War met in Dayton, Ohio in November 1995, and signed the Dayton Accords, a peace treaty. As part of the accords, NATO agreed to provide 60,000 troops to deploy to the region, as part of the Implementation Force (IFOR), U.S. designation Operation Joint Endeavor. These forces remained deployed until December 1996, when those remaining in the region were transferred to the Stabilization Force (SFOR). SFOR peacekeepers remained in Bosnia until 2004.

References

Further reading

Bosnia and Herzegovina
Bosnian War
United States Marine Corps in the 20th century